Oliver Schöpf (born July 18, 1990) is an Austrian professional association football player currently playing for FC Gratkorn. He plays as a midfielder.

References

1990 births
Living people
Austrian footballers
Association football midfielders
Kapfenberger SV players